The 1909–10 Challenge Cup was the 14th staging of rugby league's oldest knockout competition, the Challenge Cup.

First round

Second round

Quarterfinals

Semifinals

Final
The final was contested by Leeds and Hull F.C. at Fartown in Huddersfield.

The final was played on Saturday 16 April 1910, where Leeds drew 7-7 with Hull F.C. at Fartown in front of a crowd of 19,413. The necessitated a replay just two days later and this resulted in Leeds defeating Hull 26-12 at the same ground.

This was Leeds' first Cup final win in their first Cup final appearance. Hull lost their third Cup final in a row.

First match

Teams
Hull: Harry Taylor, G. T. Cottrell, Jim Devereux, Andy Morton,  (E. or Ned) Rogers, Harry Wallace, Billie Anderson, Tom Herridge, Will Osborne, Dick Taylor, William Holder, G. Connell, H. Walton

Leeds: Frank Young, J. Fawcett, Walter Goldthorpe, C. Gillie, F. Barron, E. Ware, J. Sanders, W. Biggs, Billy Jarman, Fred Harrison, Harry Topham, Fred Webster, Billy Ward

Result
Leeds: 7

Leeds Tries: Walter Goldthorpe

Leeds Goals: Frank Young 2

Hull: 7

Hull Tries: G. T. Cottrell

Hull Goals:  (E. or Ned) Rogers, Harry Wallace

Half-time: 2-7

Attendance: 19,413 (at Fartown, Huddersfield)

Replay

Teams
Leeds: Frank Young, Harold Rowe, Walter Goldthorpe, C. Gillie, F. Barron, E. Ware, J. Fawcett, Fred Webster, Fred Harrison, Harry Topham, Billy Ward, Billy Jarman, S. Whittaker

Hull: E. Rogers, G. T. Cottrell, Jim Devereux, Andy Morton, Ernest Atkinson,  Ned Rogers, Harry Wallace, Tom Herridge, Will Osborne, Dick Taylor, William Holder, G. Connell, H. Walton

Result
Leeds: 26

Leeds Tries: Rowe, Walter Goldthorpe, Fred Webster, Harry Topham

Leeds Goals: Frank Young 7

Hull: 12

Hull Tries: G. Connell, H. Walton

Hull Goals:  (E. or Ned) Rogers 3

Half-time: 16-0

Attendance: 11,608 (at Fartown, Huddersfield)

References

External links
Challenge Cup official website 
Challenge Cup 1909/10 results at Rugby League Project

Challenge Cup
Challenge Cup